Fusiturris pluteata is a species of sea snail, a marine gastropod mollusk in the family Fusiturridae.

Description
The size of an adult shell varies between 25 mm and 32 mm.
The shell is narrowly fusiform, with an elevated, acuminated spire and a long, narrow, twisted siphonal canal. The anal sinus is rather shallow and wide. The whorls show a shelf below the sutures, and a central revolving carina of small nodules. The color of the shell is horn-color, the nodules are white.

Distribution
This species occurs in the Atlantic Ocean off Madeira and West Africa (Senegal, Gabon)

References

Bibliography

 Bernard, P.A. (Ed.) (1984). Coquillages du Gabon [Shells of Gabon]. Pierre A. Bernard: Libreville, Gabon. 140, 75 plates pp.

External links
 
 Specimen of Fusiturris pluteata at MNHN, Paris

pluteata
Gastropods described in 1843